The 2022–23 season is the 135th season in the existence of Blackburn Rovers Football Club and the club's fifth consecutive season in the Championship. In addition to the league, they also competed in the FA Cup and the EFL Cup.

Season summary

Pre-season 
On 5 May, Rovers confirmed their first pre-season friendly fixture, with the club to set play Scottish Premier League champions Celtic on 16 July at Celtic Park. A week later, on 12 May, Rovers confirmed the second game of their pre-season campaign, this time against EFL League Two side Hartlepool United, set to take place on 20 July at Victoria Park. Blackburn also confirmed fixtures against EFL League One opposition Accrington Stanley and Lincoln City, with both friendlies to take place away from home, with Rovers visiting Stanley's Crown Ground on 9 July and Lincoln's Sincil Bank Stadium on 23 July.

May 

On 1 May 2022, Rovers announced u23 striker Sam Burns had signed a new one-year contract.

On 11 May 2022, Rovers announced manager Tony Mowbray will be leaving the club.

On 20 May 2022, Rovers confirmed their retained list for the 2022-23 season. The club confirmed it had activated the additional-year clauses in the contracts of Ben Brereton Diaz, Dan Butterworth, Tyler Magloire and Jordan Eastham, with the players now under contract at the club until 30 June 2023. Meanwhile, the club confirmed it had opted against offering deals to retain Bradley Johnson, Jacob Davenport, Harry Chapman, Luke Brennan, Connor McBride, Sam Durrant and Joe Nolan, whilst scholars Joe Ferguson, Brandon Lonsdale and Evan Cunningham were not offered professional deals, with all of the players to leave Rovers upon the expiration of their contracts on 30 June. Blackburn also confirmed Joe Rothwell would be departing the club, with Rothwell confirming his intention to leave at the end of his contract.

On 24 May 2022, Rovers announced assistant manager Mark Venus will be leaving the club.

On 25 May 2022, Rovers announced the appointment of Mark Burton as the club's new Under-23s assistant coach.

On 26 May 2022, Rovers announced u23 midfielder Isaac Whitehall had signed a new one-year contract with the option of a further 12 months.

June 

On 8 June 2022, Rovers announced the appointment of Gregg Broughton as Director of Football.

On 14 June 2022, Rovers announced the appointment of Jon Dahl Tomasson as our new Head Coach on a contract till June 2025. He will be joined by new assistant coach Remy Reynierse and performance director Ben Rosen.

On 15 June 2022, Rovers announced that Head of Academy coach Tony Carss would be leaving the club to take up a position at Aston Villa.

On 21 June 2022, Rovers Rovers announced u23 defender Patrick Gamble had signed his 1st professional a one-year deal until 2023 . Rovers also announced that Head of Recruitment John Park would be leaving the club. It was also announced by the club the same day that several additions to the Recruitment department had been made, with Tom Sutton (Oxford United F.C.) and Karl Newton (Stockport County) joining Anthony Bates at the club.

On 22 June 2022, Rovers announced u23 defender George Pratt had signed his 1st professional contract a two-year deal until 2024.

On 23 June 2022, Rovers announced u23 defender Jalil Saadi had signed a new contract a two-year deal until 2024, with the option of a further 12 months.

On 24 June 2022, Rovers announced u18 forward Harrison Wood had signed his 1st professional contract a two-year deal until 2024.

On 25 June 2022, Rovers announced u18 goalkeeper Felix Goddard had signed his 1st professional contract a two-year deal until 2024, with the option of a further 12 months.

On 29 June 2022, Rovers announced u18 midfielder Kristi Montgomery had signed his 1st professional contract a two-year deal until 2024, with the option of a further 12 months. Rovers also announced that Chris Renshaw has been promoted to assistant first team goalkeeping/transition coach making the step up from his role as Academy goalkeeping coach.

On 30 June 2022, Rovers announced u18 midfielder Charlie Weston had signed his 1st professional contract a two-year deal until 2024.

July 
On 14 July 2022, Rovers announced u18 defender Jay Haddow had signed his 1st professional contract a two-year deal until 2024, with the option of a further 12 months.

On 22 July 2022, Rovers announced the appointment of Gus Williams as the club’s new Head of Player Recruitment..

September 

On 2 September 2022, Rovers announced midfielder John Buckley had signed a new long term contract a 5 year deal until 2027.

On 12 September 2022, Rovers announced midfielder Adam Wharton had signed a new long term contract a 5 year deal until 2027.

On 20 September 2022, Rovers announced defender Ashley Phillips had signed his 1st professional contract a three-year deal until 2025.

On 27 September 2022, Rovers announced u23 defender Sam Barnes had signed a new contract until 2023, with the option of a further 12 months.

October 

On 12 October 2022, Rovers announced the appointment of Jordan McCann as Head of Academy Coaching.

On 24 October 2022, Rovers announced forward Jack Vale had signed a new long term contract a 3 year deal until 2025, with the option of a further 12 months.

On 25 October 2022, Rovers announced u21 defender Jake Batty had signed his 1st professional contract a three-year deal until 2025.

November 

On 17 November 2022, Rovers announced u18 midfielder James Edmundson had signed his 1st professional contract a three-year deal until 2025.

On 23 November 2022, Rovers announced the appointment of Adam Collins from Manchester City as Head of Performance Analysis, Also Luke Griffin recently arrived as Head of European Scouting.

Backroom staff
Backroom staff last updated on 27 November 2022. List is representative of staff available on rovers.co.uk.

Squad information
Players and squad numbers last updated on 8 May 2022. List is representative of players who have made an appearance for the first-team this season and of information available on Rovers.co.uk.

Note: Flags indicate national team as has been defined under FIFA eligibility rules. Players may hold more than one non-FIFA nationality.

Transfers

In

Out 

 Brackets around club names indicate the player joined that club after his Blackburn Rovers contract expired.

Loans in

Loans out

Pre-season and friendlies
Rovers announced the first of their pre-season friendly matches with a visit to Scotland to face Celtic on 16 July. On their return to England they travel to Hartlepool United on 20 July. On 16 May, a match with Lincoln City was scheduled for 23 July. A day later a fourth fixture was announced, with a trip to Accrington Stanley scheduled for 9 July 2022. On 15 June, a friendly date with Dundee was confirmed. On 29 November, a friendly against Ajax was confirmed. On 30 November, a friendly against Hearts was confirmed.

Competitions

Overall record

Championship

League table

Results summary

Results by round

Matches

On 23 June, the league fixtures were announced.

FA Cup

Rovers entered the FA Cup at the third round stage and were drawn away to Norwich City. They were drawn at home to eiher Forest Green Rovers or Birmingham City in the fourth round.

EFL Cup

Blackburn Rovers were drawn at home to Hartlepool United in the first round, away to Bradford City in the second round and away to West Ham United in the third round. A fourth round home tie against Nottingham Forest was next in the EFL Cup.

Squad statistics

Appearances and goals

|-
|colspan="14"|Players out on loan:

|-
|colspan="14"|Players that played for Blackburn Rovers this season that have left the club:

|-
|}

Goalscorers

References

Blackburn Rovers F.C. seasons
Blackburn Rovers
English football clubs 2022–23 season